Flaten is a village in the municipality of Åmli in Agder county, Norway. The population (2001) of Flaten was 32. The village has a railway station, Flaten Station, which is part of the Arendalsbanen railway line.

References

Villages in Agder
Åmli